Nick Van Sicklen (born 1 February 1983 in the United States) is an American retired soccer player.

Career

After an unsuccessful trial with Nurnberg in the German top flight, which an agent invited him to, Van Sicklen was drafted by MLS side D.C. United in 2005. Despite this, Van Sicklen said initially that "playing professionally wasn't even on the radar" and that he "was satisfied playing Division I [college soccer]". However, he only made two appearances for D.C. United, both in the CONCACAF Champions League, and eventually asked to be released. Within half a year, he signed for Canterbury United in New Zealand amid interest from MLS clubs Houston Dynamo as well as New York Red Bulls.

References

External links
 Nick Van Sicklen at SoccerStats.us

American soccer players
Living people
Association football wingers
Association football forwards
Association football midfielders
Sportspeople from Madison, Wisconsin
Soccer players from Wisconsin
1983 births